Olimpia Sports Hall is an indoor arena in Ploiești, Romania. Its best known tenant was the men's basketball club CSU Asesoft, one of the top teams of the Romanian championship.

Use

Asesoft
Olimpia Sports Hall has hosted FIBA EuroCup Challenge final four of the 2004–05  season, where CSU Asesoft 
won the trophy for the first time in a final against PBC Lokomotiv Kuban after 75-74. Asesoft played in Olimpia 2013–14 and 2014–15 Eurocup season and hosted one of the biggest teams of Europa as BC Khimki, Hapoel Jerusalem B.C., BC Krasny Oktyabr, 
KK Partizan or BC Lietuvos rytas.
They have won 9 national championships in Olimpia between 2004-2010 and 2014-2015. In 2012 and 2013 the hall was renovated so it could not host 2 more national titles.

Tricolorul LMV
Tricolorul LMV played since 2015 Divizia A1 games in Olimpia becoming in 
2017–18 for the very first time national champions and also cup winners. They will host 2018-2019 Champions League games in December 2018 for the first time in Ploiesti.

CSM Ploiesti
All sections from this club owned by the municipality of Ploiesti plays their home games here, including juniors games.

Milestones
In honour of great performances, two banners with Antonio Alexe and Vladimir Arnautovic are hanged at the north wall of the hall near ones with Asesoft's titles.

Sport in Ploiești
Indoor arenas in Romania
Basketball venues in Romania